12